Ian Broudie is a producer and musician known for his work with The Lightning Seeds, Echo & the Bunnymen and The Coral amongst others.

Albums

1980s

1980: Echo & the Bunnymen - Crocodiles
1980: Original Mirrors - Original Mirrors
1981: TV21 - A Thin Red Line
1983: Echo & the Bunnymen - Porcupine
1984: The Danse Society - Heaven Is Waiting
1985: The Pale Fountains - ...From Across the Kitchen Table
1985: Wall of Voodoo - Seven Days in Sammystown
1986: The Colourfield - The Colour Field
1986: The Three O'Clock - Ever After
1987: The Icicle Works - If You Want to Defeat Your Enemy Sing His Song
1987: The Bodines - Played
1988: Richard Jobson - Badman
1988: Human Drama - Hopes Prayers Dreams Heart Soul Mind Love Life Death
1988: The Fall  - I Am Kurious Oranj
1988: Shack - Zilch
1989: Benny Profane - Trapdoor Swing
1989: Noir Désir - Veuillez rendre l'âme (à qui elle appartient)

1990s

1990: The Lightning Seeds - Cloudcuckooland
1990: Frazier Chorus - Ray
1990: The Wild Swans - Space Flower
1991: Northside - Chicken Rhythms
1991: The Primitives - Galore
1991: The Wendys - Gobbledygook
1991: The Katydids - Shangri-La
1991: Bill Pritchard - Jolie
1992: Popinjays - Flying Down to Mono Valley
1992: The Lightning Seeds - Sense
1993: Dodgy - The Dodgy Album
1994: The Frank and Walters - Trains, Boats and Planes
1994: Alison Moyet - Essex
1994: Terry Hall - Home
1994: Dodgy - Homegrown
1994: The Lightning Seeds - Jollification
1995: Sleeper - Smart
1996: The Lightning Seeds - Dizzy Heights
1998: Republica - Speed Ballads
1999: The Lightning Seeds - Tilt

2000s

2002: The Coral - The Coral
2002: Texas - Careful What You Wish For
2003: I Am Kloot - I Am Kloot
2003: The Coral - Magic and Medicine
2004: The Coral - Nightfreak and the Sons of Becker
2004: The Zutons - Who Killed...... The Zutons?
2004: Ian Broudie - Tales Told
2005: The Subways - Young for Eternity
2006: The Rifles - No Love Lost
2006: The Automatic - Not Accepted Anywhere
2007: The Coral - Roots & Echoes
2009: The Lightning Seeds - Four Winds

2010s

2013: Miles Kane - Don't Forget Who You Are

Production discographies
Discographies of British artists
Rock music discographies